The Presentation of the Virgin Mary at the Temple is a painting by the Italian Renaissance master Cima da Conegliano, c. 1496–1497, in the Gemäldegalerie Alte Meister of Dresden, Germany, of the Presentation of Mary. The work presents the theme, apocryphal, but common in Christian art, of the presentation of the Virgin Mary in the Temple of Jerusalem, during her childhood.

References

1490s paintings
Paintings by Cima da Conegliano
Cima de Conegliano
Collections of the Gemäldegalerie Alte Meister